LHI may refer to:

 Logistics Health Incorporated, American healthcare company
 Lord Howe Island, New South Wales, Australia
 LHI Records, defunct American record label
 LHi Lab, Inc, American Marketing Agency